Dave Jerden is an American record producer, engineer, and mixer who has worked with artists in various genres including alternative rock, punk rock and metal. However, Jerden has stated that he dislikes the term "producer", preferring to refer to himself primarily as an engineer.

Jerden developed his engineering and mixing skills at Eldorado Recording Studios in Hollywood, California, beginning in the late 1970s. He engineered and mixed acclaimed and successful records by artists such as Talking Heads, David Byrne, Frank Zappa, Mick Jagger, The Rolling Stones and many others.

His career as a producer emerged in the late 1980s, beginning with albums by Jane's Addiction and Alice in Chains. Music Radar stated that these albums went against the prevailing sonic qualities of the day—dominated as it was by "hair metal bands"—and that Jerden had an important hand in shaping such genre-defining sounds. "Dave was a great guy," recalled Jane's frontman Perry Farrell, "but I wasn't always sure how he would receive my moves. I remember waiting for him to look the other way so I could push the sliders on the desk up higher."

As a producer and mixer, Jerden also worked with artists such as Fishbone, Anthrax, The Offspring, Meat Puppets, Social Distortion and Red Hot Chili Peppers.

In 1986, Jerden met with The Replacements about producing the album that would eventually become Pleased to Meet Me. Jerden's sobriety, however, was a disqualifying factor for the notoriously hard-partying Paul Westerberg and Tommy Stinson, who were both drunk for the meeting and expected any prospective producer to at least attempt to keep up with them, despite the band's then-recent firing of Stinson's brother Bob for his mounting drug and alcohol abuse.

By the mid-1990s, Jerden felt overwhelmed by the trappings of his success and decided to "lie low": working on occasional projects, but primarily experimenting with recording equipment involved in the transition from digital to analogue domains.

Jerden is the co-owner of Tranzformer Studio in Burbank, California. He has two children: Michelle Jerden Forrest and Bryan Jerden.

Selected discography
1980: Remain in Light - Talking Heads (engineer, mixing)
1981: My Life in the Bush of Ghosts - David Byrne/Brian Eno (engineer)
1981: The Red and the Black - Jerry Harrison (producer, engineer)
1983: The Man From Utopia - Frank Zappa (engineer)
1983: Future Shock - Herbie Hancock (engineer, mixing)
1984: The Red Hot Chili Peppers - The Red Hot Chili Peppers (engineer)
1985: She's the Boss - Mick Jagger (engineer)
1986: Dirty Work - The Rolling Stones (engineer)
1987: Show Me - 54-40
1988: Nothing's Shocking - Jane's Addiction
1988: Life Sentence to Love - Legal Weapon (producer, engineer, mixing)
1989: Mother's Milk - Red Hot Chili Peppers (mixing)
1990: Social Distortion - Social Distortion
1990: Ritual de lo Habitual - Jane's Addiction
1990: Facelift - Alice in Chains
1991: Circa - Mary's Danish
1991: The Reality of My Surroundings - Fishbone
1991: Symbol of Salvation - Armored Saint
1991: Burning Time - Last Crack
1991: Swandive - Bullet LaVolta
1992: Break Like the Wind - Spinal Tap (mixing, producer)
1992: Somewhere Between Heaven and Hell - Social Distortion
1992: Dirt - Alice in Chains
1992: Rattlebone - Rattlebone
1992: That What Is Not - Public Image Ltd.
1993: Independent - Sacred Reich
1993: Sweet Water - Sweet Water
1993: Sound of White Noise - Anthrax
1993: Dig - Dig
1994: Love Spit Love - Love Spit Love
1995: Driver Not Included - Orange 9mm
1995: Hello - Poe
1995: Superfriends - Sweet Water
1996: Mata Leão - Biohazard
1996: Bar Chord Ritual - Rust
1997: Wacko Magneto - Ednaswap
1997: Hang-Ups - Goldfinger 
1997: Ixnay on the Hombre - The Offspring
1998: Rattlebone - Rattlebone
1998: Americana - The Offspring
1998: Darkest Days - Stabbing Westward
1999: Suicide - Sweet Water
1999: Rev - Perry Farrell (mixing, engineer, producer)
1999: F=0 - Dis.Inc.
2000: Deviant - Pitchshifter
2001: The Pleasure and the Greed - Big Wreck
2001: Cringe - Cringe
2002: A Passage in Time - Authority Zero
2003: Before Everything & After - MxPx
2004: Dropbox - Dropbox
2013: Entitled - Richie Ramone
2015: Rare Breed - The Shrine

References

Jerden|Dave
Living people
Year of birth missing (living people)